The 2019–20 season was SK Slavia Prague's 27th season in the Czech First League. Slavia successfully defended their domestic title, winning the Czech First League for the sixth time, whilst in the Czech Cup they were knocked out in the Fourth Round by Baník Ostrava. In the UEFA Champions League, Slavia finished bottom of their group, which included Internazionale, Borussia Dortmund and Barcelona, with 2 points.

Season events
On 11 March it was announced that Slavia would play their next two matches, away to Mladá Boleslav on Saturday 14 March and at home to Jablonec on Saturday 21 March, without fans, due to the COVID-19 pandemic.

On 12 March 2020, the League Football Association announced that all Fortuna liga games had been postponed for the foreseeable future due to the COVID-19 pandemic.

After 2 months, on 12 May, the League Football Association announced that the Fortuna liga would resume on 25 May.

On 19 May, Slavia announced that one of their players had tested positive for COVID-19, with their friendly match later in the day against Vysočina Jihlava being cancelled as a result.

On 7 June, Slavia gathered a point against Plzeň (match-week 28), which was sufficient to be mathematically assured that the team will finish ahead of Sparta in the league table.

Transfers
On 17 June, Slavia announced the signing of Tomáš Holeš and David Hovorka from Jablonec on a contracts until the summer of 2023.

On 4 July, Slavia announced the signing of Nicolae Stanciu on a four-year contract from Al-Ahli.

On 11 August, Slavia announced the signing of Oscar Dorley on a four-year contract from Slovan Liberec, with the midfielder staying in Liberec until the end of 2019.

On 2 September, Slavia announced the signing of Lukáš Provod on loan from Viktoria Plzeň, with the transfer becoming permanent in the winter with Provod signing a contract until the summer of 2024.

On 6 September, Slavia announced the signing of João Felipe on a four-year contract from Palmeiras.

New contracts
On 17 June, Tomáš Souček signed a new contract with Slavia, until the summer of 2024.

On 13 February, Ondřej Kolář signed a new contract with Slavia until the summer of 2024.

Squad

Out on loan

Transfers

In

 Provod's moves were announced on the above date, but becoming official on 1 January 2020.

Loans in

Out

Loans out

Released

Pre-season and friendlies

Competitions

Overall record

Czech First League

Regular stage

League table

Results summary

Results by round

Matches

Championship group

League table

Results summary

Results by round

Matches

Czech Cup

UEFA Champions League

Qualifying rounds

Play-off round

Group stage

Squad statistics

Appearances and goals

|-
|colspan="14"|Players away from Slavia Prague on loan:

|-
|colspan="14"|Players who left Slavia Prague during the season:

|}

Goal scorers

Clean sheets

Disciplinary record

References

External links
Official website

Slavia Prague
SK Slavia Prague seasons
Slavia Prague
Czech Republic football championship-winning seasons